The D.L. McRae House is a historic house at 424 East Main Street in Prescott, Arkansas.  This -story wood-frame house was designed by Charles L. Thompson and built c. 1912.  It is a well-preserved example of Thompson's work in a small-town setting, featuring Craftsman styling and a relatively unusual porch balustrade, with groups of three slender balusters clustered between porch columns.

The house was listed on the National Register of Historic Places in 1982.

See also
T.C. McRae House
National Register of Historic Places listings in Nevada County, Arkansas

References

Houses on the National Register of Historic Places in Arkansas
Houses completed in 1912
Houses in Nevada County, Arkansas
1912 establishments in Arkansas
National Register of Historic Places in Nevada County, Arkansas
Bungalow architecture in Arkansas
American Craftsman architecture in Arkansas
Prescott, Arkansas